The 2022–23 Cypriot Cup is the 81st edition of the Cypriot Cup. A total of 23 clubs were accepted to enter the competition. It began in October 2022 with the first round and will conclude in May 2023 with the final. The winner of the Cup will qualify for the 2023–24 Europa Conference League second qualifying round.

First round 
The first round draw took place on 21 September 2022.

|colspan="3" style="background-color:#D0D0D0" align=center|5 October 2022

|-
|colspan="3" style="background-color:#D0D0D0" align=center|6 October 2022

|-
|colspan="3" style="background-color:#D0D0D0" align=center|11 October 2022

|-
|colspan="3" style="background-color:#D0D0D0" align=center|12 October 2022

|-
|colspan="3" style="background-color:#D0D0D0" align=center|19 October 2022

|-
|colspan="3" style="background-color:#D0D0D0" align=center|26 October 2022

|}

Second round 
The second round draw took place on 26 October 2022.

|colspan="3" style="background-color:#D0D0D0" align=center|2 November 2022

|-
|colspan="3" style="background-color:#D0D0D0" align=center|1 December 2022

|-
|colspan="3" style="background-color:#D0D0D0" align=center|11 January 2023

|-
|colspan="3" style="background-color:#D0D0D0" align=center|12 January 2023

|-
|colspan="3" style="background-color:#D0D0D0" align=center|17 January 2023

|-
|colspan="3" style="background-color:#D0D0D0" align=center|18 January 2023

|-
|colspan="3" style="background-color:#D0D0D0" align=center|19 January 2023

|}

Quarter-finals 
 

|}

Semi-finals 

 
 

|}

See also	
 2022–23 Cypriot First Division	
 2022–23 Cypriot Second Division

References

External links 
 
Soccerway.com

	

Cup
Cyprus
Cypriot Cup seasons